A deadly series of at least 33 tornadoes hit at least 10 different U.S. states on May 9–11, 1953. Tornadoes appeared daily from Minnesota in the north to Texas in the south. The strongest and deadliest tornado was a powerful F5 tornado  that struck Waco, Texas on May 11, causing 114 of the 144 deaths in the outbreak. Alongside the 1902 Goliad tornado, it was the deadliest tornado in Texas history and is the 11th deadliest tornado in U.S. history. The tornado's winds demolished more than 600 houses, 1,000 other structures, and over 2,000 vehicles. 597 injuries occurred, and many survivors had to wait more than 14 hours for rescue. The destruction dispelled a myth that the geography of the region spared Waco from tornadoes, and along with other deadly tornadoes in 1953, the Waco disaster was a catalyst for advances in understanding the link between tornadoes and radar-detected hook echoes. It also generated support for improved civil defense systems, the formation of weather radar networks, and improved communications between stakeholders such as meteorologists, local officials, and the public.

The Waco tornado was not the only deadly and damaging tornado in the outbreak sequence. On the same day as the Waco disaster, a high-end F4 tornado struck the Texas city of San Angelo, causing catastrophic damage, killing 13 people, and injuring more than 150. The tornado swept away numerous homes and damaged a school, but students inside escaped serious injuries. On May 9, a long-tracked F3 tornado destroyed a large swath of Hebron, Nebraska and killed five people in the area. The following day, May 10, featured numerous, often long-tracked and intense tornado families across the states of Iowa, Minnesota, and Wisconsin. Two families on nearly parallel paths traveled more than  each and killed a combined total of six people, mostly in Wisconsin. At least one of the tornado families reached F4 intensity in Wisconsin. Two other F4 tornadoes also struck Iowa. Additionally, a relatively moderate tornado of F2 intensity caused significant loss of life in a shack in Minnesota, killing six people. Although 33 tornadoes were officially registered from May 9–11, others likely occurred but either went undetected or were not officially documented.

Background
After two days of intense tornado activity, May 11, 1953, produced a rich, unstable air mass that moved northward over Texas from the Gulf of Mexico. As of 9:30 a.m. CST (15:30 UTC), thunderstorm activity from the overnight hours persisted, generating residual outflow boundaries. Already, anomalously warm surface temperatures reached the mid-70s °F (mid-20s °C) as far north as a line stretching from Dallas to Austin. Dew points were correspondingly high as well, climbing into the lower 70s °F. (lower 20s °C) As a dry line crossed the warm sector in the afternoon, a layer of cool surface temperatures left by the outflow boundaries locally enhanced low-level wind shear, acting as a mechanism to enable supercell and tornado formation. Winds backed along the outflow boundaries, perhaps aiding the formation of violent tornadoes. Due to conducive conditions for severe weather, the U.S. Weather Bureau (later the National Weather Service) Weather Forecast Office in New Orleans issued a tornado alert covering sections of Central and West Texas.

Daily statistics

May 9 event

May 10 event

May 11 event

Chester, Iowa/Wykoff–St. Charles, Minnesota/Cochrane–Catawba, Wisconsin

This destructive, violent, and extremely long-tracked tornado family likely contained at least five distinct tornadoes, spawned by one supercell. The first tornado in the series, though officially unconfirmed, may have formed near Greene in Butler County, Iowa, causing significant destruction on a farmstead. Continuous damage resumed near Chester, severely affecting 11 farms south of the Minnesota–Iowa border, with two injuries in Iowa. The storm then crossed into southern Minnesota, killing one person in a destroyed barn near Wykoff. Near Chatfield, the tornado carried a schoolhouse from its foundation, causing its disintegration. The tornado then hit a few cars halfway between Dover and St. Charles, one of which was carried , injuring four occupants and killing the fifth, a child.

In Minnesota, four other people sustained injuries while inside a barn, and three more injuries were in another automobile; in all, 17 injuries were confirmed in the state. Across Fillmore, Olmsted, and Winona counties in Minnesota, over 24 farms received widespread, often severe damage, including the destruction of most buildings in some cases. The tornado downed many power lines and utility poles as well, and there was widespread loss of livestock. Entering Whitewater State Park, the tornado splintered "hundreds" of trees, and buildings in the park were badly damaged. After destroying a steel bridge near Crystal Spring, the tornado apparently dissipated into straight-line winds, though Grazulis suggested that tornado damage may have continued to Cochrane, Wisconsin.

Reports indicated that the storm crossed the Mississippi River into Wisconsin, where tornado activity definitely resumed northeast of Cochrane and ended near Brownville. As in Minnesota, damage was discontinuous, implying that two or more tornadoes were involved. Between Cochrane and Brownsvulle, the tornado hit roughly 100 farms, at least 20 of which lost buildings, and produced high-end F3 damage to some homes. "Hundreds" of dead livestock littered the landscape. Beyond Brownsville, the tornado(es) likely weakened and reformed into two, perhaps three, others, starting with spotty damage near Gilman. The tornado was reportedly exceptionally violent while southeast of Catawba, shortly before dissipation. Five injuries occurred in Wisconsin, though the actual total may have been 12.

Maximum damage intensity was F3 in Iowa and Minnesota and F4 in Wisconsin. The swath of damage between St. Charles and Whitewater State Park, Minnesota, across Olmsted and Winona counties, may have been from a separate thunderstorm, as Grazulis does not count it as part of the same tornado family.

River Falls–Amery–Minong, Wisconsin

This was the second of two long-tracked tornado families in Wisconsin on May 10. It first formed on the outskirts of River Falls and tracked to the north-northeast. Here, the tornado demolished a summer house, which collapsed onto occupants, injuring four who had been picnicking but had sought safety during the storm. Initially, multiple tornadoes were likely present, as damage was discontinuous until the tornado(es) passed east of New Richmond. At that point, a continuous swath of significant damage began and continued to near Amery. The first fatality, an elderly female, occurred in St. Croix County when her home was leveled, injuring three other people inside. Farther on, in Polk County, two additional deaths took place: one from flying debris, another in a destroyed barn. In Burnett County, the tornado felled a tree, which hit a dairy building, causing a final death. Beyond Amery, scattered, poorly documented destruction occurred for the remainder of the path. A separate tornado likely formed near Minong and dissipated near Gordon, destroying cabins and other small residences. Six injuries occurred across Washburn and Douglas counties, one of which was severe. There were 11 injuries near Amery and 27 along the entire path. Reports from local staff of the American Red Cross indicated that the tornado family destroyed or damaged 113 homes and affected 215 other structures. Collapsing barns killed livestock inside, though the precise number was undetermined. Numerous trees were downed along the path, and utilities were disrupted. The tornado(es) mostly impacted sparsely populated areas. While officially rated F2, the tornado was assigned an F4 rating by Grazulis, based on damage to homes near Amery.

Waco, Texas

According to an old legend—attributed without corroboration to the Huaco, a local Native American tribe—tornadoes, or at least severe ones, could not touch down in Waco, a city located in a geological depression. Supposedly due to the bluffs around the Brazos River, tornadoes and other severe weather were relatively rare and mild in the city. The 1953 storm, however, disproved the myth when it tracked directly through downtown Waco as an F5 tornado. The tornado first formed around 4:10 p.m. It quickly began damaging structures, destroying a home near Lorena as it tracked north-northeastward. As it neared Waco, operators of weather radar at Texas A&M University detected a hook echo in association with the parent supercell. This was one of the first times that radar linked tornadogenesis with hook-echo signatures. However, because heavy rain obscured the tornado, it was largely invisible to people in its path. The high-precipitation nature of the parent storm may have heightened the death toll in Waco by delaying appropriate action. The storm also generated baseball-sized hail in its path. The tornado passed close to Hewitt before entering downtown Waco.

As the thunderstorm began pounding the city with rain, many people on the streets crowded into local buildings for shelter, yet few of the buildings in downtown Waco were constructed sturdily enough to withstand the winds, so they collapsed almost immediately. 30 people died in the R. T. Dennis building alone. Newer buildings with steel reinforcement, including the 22-story Amicable office building (now called the ALICO Building), weathered the storm. The Dr Pepper bottling plant, today the Dr Pepper Museum, also remained standing but sustained damage. Some survivors were trapped under rubble for 14 or more hours; numerous bodies remained buried beneath piles of rubble and for many days were unaccounted for. While the tornado destroyed homes outside the city, media largely focused on destruction in downtown Waco.

In all, 114 deaths occurred in the Waco area, with 597 injured and over $41 million (1953 USD) in property damage. The tornado destroyed 196 businesses and factories. 150 homes were wrecked. Over 2,000 cars sustained at least some damage.

Aftermath and records

Following the Waco tornado, attempts to organize disaster relief were stymied by poor organization. Local residents had not expected the tornado and had assumed that the area's geography safeguarded Waco from tornadoes. Initially, the tornado also severed communications between downtown Waco and outlying areas, so assistance was slow to arrive. The chaotic relief efforts eventually spurred greater coordination between civilians and local governments, leading to the development of civil defense. Notably, the Waco event was one of the first instances that proved the effectiveness of radar in tracking tornadogenesis; coincidentally, another such case occurred later in the same year. Posthumous study of the tornado that struck Worcester, Massachusetts, on June 9 revealed that, as at Waco, local radar detected the hook echo that signified the tornado. Researchers concluded that improved communications, coupled with the formation of radar coverage, could lead to accurate tornado warnings, thereby reducing loss of life in future storms. This task proved especially important following the devastating loss of life at Waco and Worcester, along with the June 8 catastrophe at Flint, Michigan, in the same year. The state of Texas supported the implementation of 20 radar facilities, each with a  radius, that proved successful in reducing death tolls in later tornadoes. The system was known as the Texas Radar Tornado Warning Network and also included communications between weather officials, storm spotters, and local officials. Thus the Waco tornado helped catalyze development of a nationwide severe weather warning system.

The Waco tornado remains the eleventh deadliest tornado on record in the United States and is tied with the 1902 Goliad tornado as the deadliest in Texas history.

See also
 List of F5 and EF5 tornadoes
 List of North American tornadoes and tornado outbreaks
 List of tornadoes striking downtown areas
 1922 Austin twin tornadoes
 1970 Lubbock tornado

Notes

References

External links
 Texas History Online

F5 tornadoes
Tornadoes of 1953
Tornadoes in Iowa
Tornadoes in Kansas
Tornadoes in Minnesota
Tornadoes in Nebraska
Tornadoes in Texas
Tornadoes in Wisconsin
History of Waco, Texas
1953 natural disasters in the United States
May 1953 events in the United States